The 1957 season of the Primera División Peruana, the top category of Peruvian football, was played by 10 teams. The national champions were Centro Iqueño. At the end of the regular season (home and away matches) teams were split in 2 groups of 5 teams: top 5 played for the title and bottom 5 played for the relegation. Teams carried their regular season records and played an additional round (4 further matches).

Results

Standings

External links 
 Peru 1957 season at RSSSF
 Peruvian Football League News 

Peru1
1957 in Peruvian football
Peruvian Primera División seasons